Kadinte Makkal is a 1986 Indian Malayalam film, directed by P. S. Prakash. The film has musical score by Ramesh Naidu.

Cast

References

External links
 

1986 films
1980s Malayalam-language films